"Dirrty" is a song by American singer Christina Aguilera featuring American rapper Redman, released as the lead single from her fourth studio album Stripped. Despite Aguilera's first three years of commercial success, she was displeased with the lack of control over her image. In response, she desired to create a song that would represent her authentic persona. She approached hip hop producer Rockwilder and suggested using Redman's 2001 song "Let's Get Dirty (I Can't Get in da Club)" as a guide. The final result, "Dirrty", is an R&B and hip hop song that also features rapping verses from Redman and describes sexual activities.

RCA Records sent "Dirrty" to American radio stations on September 3, 2002, as the lead single from Stripped. RCA and Bertelsmann Music Group later released the song as a CD single. The song peaked at number 48 on the US Billboard 100. Outside of the United States, "Dirrty" saw significant success in the British Isles, topping the charts in Ireland and the United Kingdom. Elsewhere, the song peaked within the top ten in many countries including Australia, Denmark, Germany, the Netherlands, Spain, Sweden and Switzerland.

David LaChapelle directed the music video for "Dirrty", which was intended to publicize Aguilera's new image. Depicting sexual fetishes such as mud wrestling and muscle worshipping, the controversial video eliminated her previous image as a bubblegum pop singer. Various news publications and other recording artists criticized the video, and it was banned on Thai television due to its sexual content, but Aguilera defended the video, calling it inspirational as it put her to the forefront. "Dirrty" was included on the setlists of Aguilera's five major concert tours: The Justified & Stripped Tour (2003), The Stripped Tour (2003), Back to Basics Tour (2006–2008), The Liberation Tour (2018), and The X Tour (2019).

Development

Despite rising to prominence with the commercial success of her 1999 self-titled debut album, Aguilera was displeased with being marketed as her then-manager Steve Kurtz desired, and felt unable to control her image. She explained to The Sydney Morning Herald her dissatisfaction with being a part of the late 1990s teen pop trend, "The label [RCA Records] wanted to push the cookie-cutter, [...] almost virginal kind of imagery that wasn't me. I really wanted to squirm away from that, because I really thought it was really fake and superficial and untrue of what I was about."

"Dirrty" was among the last tracks to be recorded for Aguilera's 2002 album, Stripped. It was recorded at the Enterprise Studios in Burbank and Conway Studios in Hollywood, Los Angeles by Oscar Ramirez, Wassim Zreik, and Dylan "3-D" Dresdow. Desiring to create a "down and dirty" song to complement her new image, she approached hip hop producer Rockwilder, who had worked with her on "Lady Marmalade", and suggested recording a song similar to Redman's 2001 hip hop song "Let's Get Dirty (I Can't Get in da Club)". "Dirrty" ultimately became a "near-remake" of its predecessor, as Entertainment Weekly said. Rapper Redman, who previously appeared on Eminem's 2001 song "Off the Wall", in which Eminem disses Aguilera, is featured on the song. Aguilera intended to use a misspelled title to personalize the song, also considering "Dirtee" or "Dirrdy". The title reflects the music video, which Aguilera describes as "gritty, [with] underground, illegal stuff going on."

Composition
"Dirrty" is a hip hop and R&B song. Composed in the key of G minor, it has a moderately fast tempo of 100 beats per minute. The lines in the refrain and Redman's rapping verses are emphasized by a pair of B♭ octave dyads. Aguilera's vocal range on the track spans F3 to F#5. Redman's original ape-like sounds from "Let's Get Dirty" are also featured on "Dirrty". According to Stylus Magazine's Todd Burns, the song features a bassline which "doesn't quite mesh with the song in a natural way" and an "effective" overdubbing technique. The song's lyrics detail sexual activities such as table dancing. Jon Pareles noted that Aguilera was determined to shed her teen pop image that she achieved with her early works, and decided to show her sexuality and aggression in the "self-explanatory" "Dirrty". A sequel to the song entitled "Still Dirrty" was recorded by Aguilera for her 2006 album, Back to Basics.

Release and chart performance
"Dirrty" was released as the lead single from Stripped. RCA Records encouraged Aguilera to release the ballad "Beautiful" as the first single from Stripped. Aguilera insisted on releasing "Dirrty" as the lead single, as she felt that it represented her "real" persona. RCA Records sent "Dirrty" to US pop and rhythmic radio stations on September 3, 2002. It debuted at number 64 on the Hot 100 Airplay chart on September 21, 2002, and rose to number 49 the following week. It dropped one place to number 50 on the chart issue dated October 5, 2002. RCA Records released it in the United States as a 12-inch single on September 24, 2002, and as a CD single with "I Will Be" as a B-side on October 14. Another US CD featuring "Make Over" as its B-side was released on December 10. "Dirrty" was also released as a CD single in Germany on October 14, and in the United Kingdom on November 11 by RCA and Sony Music Entertainment.

"Dirrty" was Aguilera's first single to fail to enter the top 20 of the US Billboard Hot 100, peaking at number 48 on October 5, 2002. It debuted at number 67 on September 21, 2002, and rose to number 49 the following week. "Dirrty" additionally charted at number 14 on Top 40 Mainstream, number 20 on Rhythmic Top 40, and number 22 on Top 40 Tracks. On October 14, 2022, it was certified platinum by the Recording Industry Association of America (RIAA) for shipments of 1,000,000 copies.

Outside of the United States, "Dirrty" debuted at number seven on the Canadian Singles Chart in Canada on November 30, 2002, and later peaked at number five on February 15, 2003.

In the United Kingdom, the single debuted at the top of the UK Singles Chart on November 17, 2002—for the week ending date November 23, 2002—becoming Aguilera's third number one and remaining on the top spot for two weeks, and was certified platinum by the British Phonographic Industry.

The song reached the top 10 of the charts in many other European countries including Ireland (number one), Netherlands (number two), Norway, Spain, and Switzerland (number three), Belgian Flanders, Denmark, and Germany (number four), and Austria and Hungary (number five). Overall, the song peaked at number three on the European Hot 100 Singles chart on December 7, 2002.

"Dirrty" also peaked at number four on the ARIA Singles Charts in Australia and was certified platinum by the Australian Recording Industry Association.

Critical reception
"Dirrty" received mixed reviews from music critics, some praised its production, while others criticized the heavily sexual persona Aguilera adopted on the song. Cinquemani from Slant Magazine called it "the most instantly gratifying" song from Stripped. Todd Burns from Stylus Magazine labeled it "one of the most interesting songs of the year" and compared its styles to Britney Spears' "image transformation" on "I'm a Slave 4 U". In a separate review, Burns deemed it the best single of 2002, writing, "That's what pop music is all about, appealing to as many people as possible." Writing for The Guardian, Betty Clarke described the song's lyrics as "majestically filthy." Reviewing Aguilera's 2008 compilation album Keeps Gettin' Better: A Decade of Hits, Nick Levine from Digital Spy called "Dirrty" the "sluttiest, sweatiest club banger in recent memory."

Jancee Dunn called the release of "Dirrty" as the lead single "a shame" and opined that it misrepresented the rest of the album. Likewise, Stephen Thomas Erlewine from AllMusic was disappointed towards the track's being released as the lead single and found Aguilera's vocal range in the song too narrow. Michael Paoletta from Billboard called the song "horribly derivative", while NMEs Jim Wirth said that "Dirrty" was "probably the pick of an inconsistent crop." Entertainment Weekly critic Seymour Craig gave it a D−, calling Aguilera's voice "desperate and shrill," and found it to be an unsuccessful attempt to gain street cred. "Dirrty" won the Best Single award at the 2003 Q Awards. The song also earned a Grammy nomination for Best Pop Collaboration with Vocals at the 45th Grammy Awards, but lost to Santana's "The Game of Love" featuring Michelle Branch.

In 2022, Billboard ranked "Dirrty" at number twenty-two on its list of the hundred greatest 2002 songs, calling it "a blueprint to reinvention in the pop game".

Music video

Development and content

The music video for "Dirrty" was directed by David LaChapelle. It was filmed on September 8–9, 2002, in Los Angeles, at an abandoned newspaper print building. Aguilera took boxing lessons to prepare for the video, and more than 100 dancers auditioned. Aguilera wanted to make sure that she and LaChapelle had the same vision for the video, never wanted to be "glossy or pretty." A scene where Aguilera is lowered into a boxing ring in a cage and a dance routine in the ring were filmed on the first day. The following day, a foxy boxing scene, a table dancing part, a party scene with Redman's rapping his verse, and a shower scene were filmed. The video premiered on MTV on September 30, 2002, on Making the Video, and was described as "a post-apocalyptic orgy."

The video opens with Aguilera gearing up and riding a motorcycle into a nightclub. Wearing a bikini and butt-baring chaps, she is lowered from a cage into a boxing ring and dances, accompanied by several backup dancers. A masked woman is lowered into the ring, and the two engage in foxy boxing. The scene is intercut with sequences of Aguilera dancing in a red belly top, which she later removes to reveal a bra, and a microskirt. Redman then proceeds down a hallway, passing people such as mud wrestlers, a contortionist, and furries. The video proceeds to a scene of Aguilera and backup dancers splashing and dancing while being sprayed with water in a room. It features several sexual fetishes, from mud wrestling to muscle worshipping.

Reception and impact
Billboard placed "Dirrty" at number twenty six on its 2018 list of the greatest music videos of the 21st century, calling it "ahead of its time". Despite controversy, "Dirrty" is considered to be Aguilera's most recognized music video, with the singer herself calling it her "personal favorite from her catalog" in 2018, even wearing the infamous chaps from the video on both her Liberation Tour (2018) and her Vegas residency Christina Aguilera: The Xperience (2019–2020).

"Dirrty" was picked as the fifth greatest music video throughout TRL history in the final countdown on November 16, 2008. LA Weekly selected it as the fourth greatest music video on TRL, writing: "Ass-less chaps: An underutilized pop star accessory." The video was nominated for Best Female Video, Best Dance Video, Best Pop Video, and Best Choreography at the 2003 MTV Video Music Awards. It also earned six nominations at the 2003 Music Video Production Association Awards, and won two: Best Styling and Best Make-Up. The video ranked at number 100 on Slant Magazine's list of "The 100 Greatest Music Videos of All Time" in 2003. In late 2008, the video was voted the ninth "Sexiest Music Video of All Time" by over a quarter of a million FHM readers in a poll the magazine ran worldwide. It also appeared at number two on VH1 list of "Scandalously Sexy Music Videos" in 2013.

When Aguilera's collaborator Linda Perry first saw the video, she asked Aguilera: "Are you high? This is annoying. Why are you doing this?" Protests also occurred in Thailand over Thai-language posters in the video that translate to "Thailand's Sex Tourism" and "Young Underage Girls". LaChapelle stated that he was unaware of what the posters stated, and Aguilera's recording company in the country banned Thai television stations from playing the video.

The public widely rejected Aguilera's new image so much that it began to overshadow her music. Tim Walker from The Independent wrote: "[Aguilera] simulated masturbation while wearing little more than a pair of leather chaps." Entertainment Weekly described Aguilera's image in the video as "the world's skeeziest reptile woman," and The Village Voice captioned her as a xenomorph from the Alien series. Aguilera's contemporaries Shakira, Kelly Osbourne, and Jessica Simpson expressed disapproval of the video. Time magazine commented that "she appeared to have arrived on the set... direct from an intergalactic hooker convention." Jancee Dunn of Rolling Stone dubbed the video Girls Gone Wild: Beyond Thunderdome. Writer Emma Forrest remarked: "What she's depicting is subcultures within sexuality, and to say that this is normal young woman's sexuality is just not fair. Even Madonna never did that to girls." Aguilera responded to the criticism in Blender:

In 2017, Amy Roberts of Bustle noticed that Aguilera received a sexist, misogynistic backlash because of "Dirrty's" music video, while also remarked that it "wasn't made to specifically fulfill heterosexual male fantasies". According to Roberts, the video was "grimy and subversive, and it had an overbearing aggressive sexuality that wasn't accessible to the masses". She further praised the video as "raw", "visceral" and "ahead of time", and believed "it was exactly what the music industry needed to happen in the early '00s" because of its inappropriateness.

Despite the criticism, the video was a number-one video on MTV's countdown series TRL in October 2002. In January 2021, WWE wrestler Liv Morgan have paid tribute to Aguilera's clothing in the video—she wore an identical outfit during the Royal Rumble pay-per-view event.

Live performances

Aguilera's first televised performance of "Dirrty" was for a program called TRL Presents: Christina Stripped in New York City in October 2002.  Next she performed the song at the 2002 MTV Europe Music Awards in Barcelona, recreating the music video's scenes and wearing the same chaps as she did in the video for the performance. She later performed the song on UK television shows CD:UK and Top of the Pops in 2002, and then as part of a medley with "Fighter" at the 2003 MTV Video Music Awards in August 2003, which was backed by guitarist Dave Navarro.

"Dirrty" was included on the setlists of Aguilera's three major concert shows. For the 2003 Justified & Stripped Tour and Stripped Tour, it was the opening song on the setlists. For the performance, Aguilera appeared in torso-baring black outfit and black hair, which, according to the San Francisco Chronicles Neva Cholin and MTV's Christina Fuoco, resembled Cher's styles. The performance at the Wembley Arena in London was recorded for the 2004 video release Stripped Live in the U.K.. "Dirrty" was also included on the setlist of Aguilera's 2006–2008 Back to Basics Tour, as part of the circus segment. The performance incorporated elements of "Cell Block Tango" from the Broadway musical Chicago, and "Entrance of the Gladiators" by Julius Fučík, and featured a carousel horse. Ben Walsh from The Independent highlighted "Dirrty" as the best song of the concert. However, The Observers Kitty Empire called it "blushery." The performance at the Adelaide Entertainment Centre in Adelaide was recorded for the 2008 video release Back to Basics: Live and Down Under.

In May 2016, Aguilera performed the song during the Mawazine music festival in front of a crowd of 250,000 people. In July 2021, she performed "Dirrty" for two nights at the Hollywood Bowl with Gustavo Dudamel and the Los Angeles Philharmonic. Aguilera also sang excerpts from the song during the 47th People's Choice Awards. and selected it as a show opener for her Expo 2020 concert in Dubai.

In the media
The song was referenced in the lyrics of P. Diddy's single "Show Me Your Soul" (featuring Lenny Kravitz, Loon & Pharrell Williams), which promoted the Bad Boys II soundtrack. In 2020, the British magazine i-D ranked the song at number four on a list of the Best Pop Comebacks of the 21st Century, calling the choice to release it as a single "immaculate". The song was featured in the episode of the sixth season of RuPaul's Drag Race All Stars, where contestants Manila Luzon and Kylie Sonique Love had to lipsync to it in order to win the competition.

In the How I Met Your Father episode titled "Dirrty Thirty" a Christina Aguilera-themed birthday party is planned, focusing on the song and its music video.

Formats and track listingsAmerican 12" vinyl single "Dirrty"  – 4:01
 "I Will Be" – 4:12
 "Dirrty" – 4:58European CD maxi single "Dirrty"  – 4:01
 "I Will Be" – 4:12
 "Dirrty" – 4:58
 "Dirrty" (video) – 4:49American CD single "Dirrty" – 5:00
 "Make Over" – 4:12Dance Vault Mixes digital EP "Dirrty"  – 4:06
 "Dirrty"  – 8:40
 "Dirrty"  – 8:11

Credits and personnel
Credits are adapted from the liner notes of Stripped.Recording location Recorded at The Enterprise Studios, Burbank, California and Conway Studios, Hollywood, Los Angeles, CaliforniaPersonnel'

 Songwriting – Christina Aguilera, Dana Stinson, Balewa Muhammad, Reginald Noble, Jasper Cameron
 Production – Rockwilder, Christina Aguilera
 Vocals – Christina Aguilera, Redman
 Background vocals – Redman
 Recording – Oscar Ramirez, Wassim Zreik, Dylan "3-D" Dresdow
 Mixing – Dave "Hard Drive" Pensado
 Assistant mixing – Ethan Willoughby

Charts

Weekly charts

Year-end charts

Decade-end charts

Certifications and sales

Release history

References

2002 singles
2002 songs
American hip hop songs
Christina Aguilera songs
Irish Singles Chart number-one singles
Music video controversies
Music videos directed by David LaChapelle
Number-one singles in Scotland
RCA Records singles
Redman (rapper) songs
Song recordings produced by Rockwilder
Songs written by Balewa Muhammad
Songs written by Christina Aguilera
Songs written by Redman (rapper)
Songs written by Rockwilder
UK Singles Chart number-one singles